Bardanes may refer to:

 Philippikos Bardanes (died 713), Byzantine emperor in 711–713
 Bardanes Tourkos (died 803), Byzantine general and rebel
 George Bardanes (died c. 1240), Byzantine bishop and theologian
 Bardanes (moth), a genus of moths